Bemerhak Negia Mikan (A Touch Away) is an album by Israeli rock singer and guitarist Izhar Ashdot. Ashdot started to work on the album in 2003, and released it on January 9, 2005. The album includes a very successful song with the same name.

Track listing
"Im Klot HaSufa" (With the End of the Storm) – 4:25
"Lo Leabed Otach" (Don't Lose You) – 3:04
"Bemerhk Negia Mikan" (A Touch Away) – 4:30
"Olam Shel Gvarim" (Men's World) – 3:35
"Avanim" (Stones) – 4:35
"Leachat Shebegan Eden" (To One in Heaven) – 3:47
"HaDibuk" (The Dybbuk) – 4:32
"Kol Haor Sherak Efshar Laset" (All the Light You Can Carry) – 5:26
"Sulamot VeHavalim" (Ropes and Ladders) – 4:26
"Tni Li Ledaber Itach" (Let Me Speak with You) – 4:52

Personnel
 Izhar Ashdot - Guitars, Vocals, Keyboards
 Tzuf Philosof - Bass, Vocals
 Ran Efron - Keyboards, Guitars, Vocals
 Moshe Levi - Bass, Keyboards
 Tal Bergman - Drums, Percussion
 Peter Roth - Bass, Vocals, Tambourine
 Nitzan Hen Razael - Violins
 Rona Keinan - Backing Vocals
 Udi Henis - Harmonica

2005 albums